Suess is an impact crater in the Mare Australe quadrangle of Mars, located at 67.1°S latitude and 178.6°W longitude. It measures  in diameter and was named after Austrian geologist Eduard Suess. The name was approved in 1973, by the International Astronomical Union (IAU) Working Group for Planetary System Nomenclature.

See also 
 List of craters on Mars

References 

Mare Australe quadrangle
Impact craters on Mars